Tyazhstankohydropress is a plant in Kirovsky District of Novosibirsk, Russia. It produces hydraulic presses, metalworking machines, pumps, pump stations etc. The plant was founded in 1943.

History
In 1943, the plant produced the first hydraulic press.

In 1959, Richard Nixon visited the plant.

Bibliography

References

Manufacturing companies based in Novosibirsk
Kirovsky District, Novosibirsk
Companies established in 1943
Manufacturing companies of the Soviet Union
Manufacturing companies established in 1943